A shimmy is a dance move in which the body is held still, except for the shoulders, which are quickly alternated back and forth. When the right shoulder goes back, the left one comes forward.

History 
In 1917, a dance-song titled "Shim-Me-Sha-Wabble" by Spencer Williams was published, as "The Jazz Dance", which included the "Shimmy-She", among others. Shimmy also means 'scruffy dress code'.

Gilda Gray attributed to American Indians in a 1919 interview with Variety saying "You may not believe it but the original shimmy dance has never been properly introduced in New York. I know, for I have studied the dancing characteristics of the Indians for a long time and they are really responsible for the shimmy which they labelled the 'Shima Shiwa'. There have been continual efforts on the part of this dancer and that one, with each declaring that his or her version is the 'original.' There is no doubt but that the shimmy dance as it was constructed by the American Indian would have a greater popularity if done right."

"I Wish I Could Shimmy Like My Sister Kate" was an up-tempo jazz dance song, written by Clarence Williams and Armand Piron, and published in 1919 which has been popular ever since and performed and recorded by many artists. 

Flappers often performed the dance in the 1920s. The origin of the name is often falsely attributed to Gilda Gray, a Polish emigrant to America. An anecdote says that when she was asked about her dancing style, she answered, in heavy accent, "I'm shaking my chemise". In an interview Gilda denied having said this, and earlier usages of the word are recorded. In the late 1910s, others were also attributed as being the "inventor" of the shimmy, including Bee Palmer and the jazz duo Frank Hale and Signe Paterson. Mae West, in her autobiography Goodness Had Nothing to Do with It, claimed to have re-titled the "Shimmy-Shawobble" as the Shimmy, after seeing the moves in some black nightclubs.

The dance was often considered to be obscene and was frequently banned from dance halls during the 1920s.

The move is also known in Gypsy dances. In Russian this move is called "Tsyganochka", or "gypsy girl", and is done by gypsy female dancers to produce a chime of costume decorations made of the sewn-on coins.

The dance move with this name is used in various modern dances.

In the early 1960s, several dance songs featuring the Shimmy became hits, including Bobby Freeman's "Shimmy, Shimmy", the Olympics' "Shimmy Like Kate", and Little Anthony & the Imperials' "Shimmy Shimmy Ko-ko Bop".

Belly dance 
The shimmy is also a class of belly dance moves. Depending on the desired effect, style, teacher, and country of origin of the particular dance, a shimmy might be executed differently, but altogether, the shimmy will manifest as a fast shaking or shuddering movement that can be rhythmic or arrhythmic.  The movement may be localised, such as in the hips, shoulder, chest, etc., or the move might be loose and general, reverberating through the entire body. Shimmies in belly dance can also have orientation, such as an up/down movement or a twisting movement of the hips.

References

Sources 
 "Vaudeville Volleys," Variety, July 8, 1919, p. 1055.

External links
 Shimmy at "Dance History Archives"
 , in first 2 minutes of film Harold Lloyd is ejected from a "no shimmying" club

Dance moves
Novelty and fad dances
1910s in the arts
Flappers